Queen of Mystery is a South Korean television series starring Choi Kang-hee, Kwon Sang-woo, Lee Won-keun and Shin Hyun-been. It aired on KBS2 from April 5 to May 25, 2017 on Wednesdays and Thursdays at 22:00 (KST) for 16 episodes.

Synopsis 
The drama centres on a prosecutor's wife, Yoo Seol-ok (Choi Kang-hee), who has always wanted to become a police officer. One day, she gets to know a passionate detective Ha Wan-seung (Kwon Sang-woo) and he gives her an opportunity to make her dream come true. They start working on mysterious cases together.

Cast

Main 
 Choi Kang-hee as Yoo Seol-ok (Sue Yoo)
 Kwon Sang-woo as Ha Wan-seung (Warren Ha)
 Lee Won-keun as Hong Joon-oh (Gelo Hong)
 Shin Hyun-been as Jung Ji-won (Shannon Jung)

Supporting

People around Seol Ok 
 Kim Hyun-sook as Kyung-mi, Seol Ok's friend
 Shim Wan-joon as Detective Ko
 Yoon Hee-seok as Kim Ho-chul, Seol Ok's husband
 Jeon Soo-jin as Kim Ho-soon, Seol Ok's sister-in-law
 Park Joon-geum as Park Kyung-suk, Seol Ok's mother-in-law

People around Wan Seung 
 Ahn Gil-kang as Bae Kwang-tae
 Kim Min-jae as Lee Dong-gi
 Jang Gwang as Ha Jae-ho
 Yang Ik-Joon as Jang Do-jang

Others 
 Park Byung-eun as Woo Sung-ha
 Cha Min-ji as Ko Joo-yeon
 Jung Yeon-joo as Jin
 Lee Seon-hee as Seon-hui
 Han Ki-woong as Cha Min-woo / No Doo-gil (Ep. 7-8)	
 Jung In-gi  as Jang Woo-sup
 Lee Yoo-joon as Park Won Hee
 Hong Kyung as a Bully.

Production 
The series is based on a script by Lee Seong-min which was one of the winners in the 2016 KBS TV Drama Miniseries Competition alongside My Fair Lady and Two Cops.

Ratings 
The blue numbers represent the lowest ratings and the red numbers represent the highest ratings.
NR denotes that the drama did not rank in the top 20 daily programs on that date.

Awards and nominations

References

External links
 
 
  

Korean Broadcasting System television dramas
2017 South Korean television series debuts
2017 South Korean television series endings
South Korean mystery television series
South Korean comedy television series
Television series by AStory